Woodbury Hill is a hill near the village of Great Witley, about  south-west of Stourport-on-Severn in Worcestershire, England. It is the site of an Iron Age hillfort.

Description
The hill overlooks the River Teme to the south-west. The fort (a scheduled monument) has a single rampart with an external ditch. There is an entrance with inturned ramparts at the south-west, and other entrances. A track leads north to south through the site.

History
The fort is called "Owen Glendower's Camp". In 1405 it was the site of a standoff between the Welsh/French army of Owain Glyndŵr and the army of King Henry IV of England. The armies took up battle positions, the English on Abberley Hill and the Welsh and French on Woodbury Hill. They never engaged in battle; with their supply routes blocked, the Welsh began to starve. Henry stood down his army, and the Welsh army headed home.

During the English civil war, local peasants met here to form a clubmen society to protect themselves from the ravages of both the Royalist and Roundhead troops.

See also
 Hillforts in Britain

References

Hill forts in Worcestershire
Scheduled monuments in Worcestershire